KSPS-TV (channel 7) is a PBS member television station in Spokane, Washington, United States, owned by KSPS Public Television. The station's studios are located on South Regal Street in the Southgate neighborhood of Spokane, and its transmitter is located on Krell Hill southeast of Spokane.

History
On April 24, 1967, KSPS-TV first signed on the air, from the basement of Adams Elementary of Spokane Public Schools. It was affiliated with National Educational Television (NET), and moved to its successor network, PBS, on October 5, 1970. A series of school levy failures in the early 1970s forced the station to secure alternate funding and, in 1972, Friends of Seven, now known as Friends of KSPS, was founded to provide financial support to KSPS.

On July 26, 2012, the board of Spokane Public Schools voted unanimously to spin off KSPS to the Friends of KSPS. A day later, the Friends of KSPS board also voted unanimously to move forward with taking full control of the station. The transition from an educational license to a community license was completed in fall 2013. School board employees working for KSPS would become employees of the non-profit organization. Gary Stokes, the executive director of the Friends of KSPS, says that he hopes to "keep things as business-as-usual as possible. That includes keeping the employees a part of our station." Friends of KSPS has become the primary financial supporter for the station in recent years and Stokes said he believed that his organization was in a position to take over the station outright. The station plans to remain at Ferris High School in the short term; the school board has no plans to sell the building in which the station is located.  Soon after the sale closed and the station officially became a community-licensed station, Friends of KSPS changed its trading name to KSPS Public Television.

Programming
KSPS provides programing from PBS and local sources. The station's main signal reaches parts of Washington and Idaho, and it operates a translator network covering parts of Washington, Idaho, Oregon and Montana. It is also carried on cable in most of Alberta and parts of British Columbia, and on satellite systems across western Canada. Montana and Alberta are on the Mountain Time Zone, and programs are viewed one hour later by local time.

A significant portion of the station's donations and viewing audience comes from Calgary and Edmonton. Calgary and Edmonton each have populations which are more than double the entire population of KSPS's American coverage area, and most of the station's members live in those two cities. Not only must KSPS take its large Canadian audience into account in its programming, but a significant portion of its donations are in Canadian dollars. It is one of five local Spokane TV stations seen in Canada on Shaw Cable.

It was the first station to carry Mary Ann Wilson's Sit and Be Fit program, as KSPS serves as the primary production studio and distributor of the series since it debuted in 1987.

Tower collapse
On November 29, 2006, ice and wind caused the top  of the station's antenna at the Krell Hill transmission site to collapse, disrupting its off-air signal. Other area television broadcasters promised to lend short-term support. Cable and satellite feeds in the U.S. and Canada were not affected, as fiber is used to transmit the signal to the head ends. Over-the-air broadcasts were interrupted for almost a month while the tower was being repaired.

Technical information

Subchannels
The station's digital signal is multiplexed:

Analog-to-digital conversion
KSPS-TV discontinued regular programming on its analog signal, over VHF channel 7, on February 17, 2009, the original target date in which full-power television stations in the United States were to transition from analog to digital broadcasts under federal mandate (which was later pushed back to June 12, 2009). The station's digital signal relocated from its pre-transition VHF channel 8 (where its digital signal was originally slated to remain post-transition) to channel 7.

Translators

References

External links

PBS member stations
Television channels and stations established in 1967
Spokane Public Schools
SPS-TV
1967 establishments in Washington (state)